Jacob Virtanen (born August 17, 1996) is a Canadian professional ice hockey who is currently with the Fischtown Pinguins of the Deutsche Eishockey Liga (DEL). Virtanen was drafted by the Vancouver Canucks sixth overall in the 2014 NHL Entry Draft.

Virtanen played junior hockey with the Calgary Hitmen of the Western Hockey League (WHL) and has represented Canada five times in international competition at the 2013 World U-17 Hockey Challenge, 2013 U-18 Junior World Cup, 2014 IIHF World U18 Championships, 2015 IIHF World U20 Championships and 2016 IIHF World U20 Championships.

Early life
Virtanen was born August 17, 1996 in New Westminster, British Columbia, and spent his first 12 years living in Langley, British Columbia, before settling in nearby Abbotsford. Growing up, Virtanen attended Fraser Middle School Hockey Academy where he played rugby through grade 7 and 8. In eighth grade, he helped the team win the Fraser Valley 7s and the full-on league for Grade 8 15-a-side teams. He caught the attention of his physical education teacher who, after convincing him to continue playing rugby seriously, personally trained him on the rules of the sport. Virtanen's middle school fed directly into the W.A. Fraser Skills academy, which he also attended along with Yale Hockey Academy. While attending Yale Secondary School which worked with the hockey Academy, Virtanen was praised for his wrist shot from the executive director Billy Wilms. He said in an interview that "Jake stood out as a kid who you just knew was going to be a pro, in grade 9...His wrist shot was harder than my slap shot when we did skill testing...Jake steps up and fires an 81 with a snapper, and he was only in grade 9."

His father, Rainer, immigrated from Finland and his mother is French Canadian. Virtanen acquired jus sanguinis Finnish citizenship through his father and has a tattoo of the Finnish coat of arms on his right forearm.

Playing career

Minor
Growing up in Abbotsford, Virtanen began his minor hockey career there. As a member of the Abbotsford Hawks at the bantam level in 2010–11, Virtanen scored 68 goals and 117 points in 59 games. As a 15-year-old, Virtanen spent most of the 2011–12 season in midget hockey with the Fraser Valley Bruins where he scored 39 points in 39 games and recorded 120 penalty minutes.

Junior
The Western Hockey League (WHL)'s Calgary Hitmen selected Virtanen with the first overall pick at the 2011 WHL Bantam Draft. He appeared in nine games for the Hitmen during the 2011–12 season and was a regular for Calgary in 2012–13. Virtanen scored 16 goals and 34 points in 62 games and began to establish himself as a highly ranked prospect for the 2014 NHL Entry Draft.

Returning to Calgary for his second full junior season, Virtanen nearly tripled his goal scoring total from the previous season and finished with 45 on the year. He added 26 assists to finish with 71 points. The NHL Central Scouting Bureau ranked Virtanen as the ninth-best North American skater for the 2014 Draft at its midseason ranking and he played in the CHL/NHL Top Prospects Game.

Virtanen moved up three spots in NHL Central Scouting's year-end ranking and entered the Draft ranked sixth among North American skaters. The Hockey News projected Virtanen to be a "pure goal scorer" in the NHL and ranked him 11th overall in its draft preview. The magazine praised both his physical ability and the quality shot, but added that he is not known as a playmaker and that his "hockey sense" required development. He had shoulder surgery in May 2014 that was expected to sideline him until December 2014.

Professional

Vancouver Canucks
Virtanen was selected 6th overall in the 2014 NHL Entry Draft by the Vancouver Canucks. He was the first British Columbia born player selected in the first round by the Canucks since Cam Neely in 1983. On July 25, 2014, Virtanen announced he had signed an entry-level contract with the Canucks via Twitter. When posting about his deal he said,"such an honour to sign with the Vancouver Canucks! I'd like to thank everybody who's helped me get to this point especially my family!!" He returned to the Hitmen for his final year of major junior hockey before being reassigned to the Canucks' American Hockey League (AHL) affiliate, the Utica Comets, following their WHL Playoff elimination. Virtanen immediately joined the Comets' 2015 Calder Cup playoffs lineup on May 18, where he made his professional debut during Game 6 of the Western Conference Semifinals. Following the 2–1 loss to the Oklahoma City Barons, he said it was "a great experience and exciting time with a great group of guys. The guys up here are a lot bigger and the game is faster. The game was exciting and the fans were amazing up here. The atmosphere in the rink is incredible." He continued to play with the Comets during their postseason push, eventually recording his first professional assist on a Sven Bärtschi goal in Game 3 of the Western Conference Finals against the Grand Rapids Griffins.

Following his stint in the AHL, Virtanen was invited to participate in the Canucks 2015 training camp prior to the 2015–16 season. He impressed during the camp by recording two goals and two assists in six pre-season games and was subsequently named to their opening night roster. His NHL debut came days later when he was subbed in as a replacement for Jared McCann on October 13 prior to the Canucks contest with the Los Angeles Kings. He went scoreless in his debut but later recording his first NHL point (an assist) on a Derek Dorsett goal in a 5–1 win against the Montreal Canadiens. On November 1, 2015, it was announced Virtanen and McCann had made the Canucks' team past their nine-game "tryout" period which would have sent them back to juniors without wasting a year of their contract. Following this decision, Virtanen, playing alongside Brandon Sutter, scored his first career NHL goal in a 3–1 win over the Philadelphia Flyers. After recording one goal and four points in 19 games with the Canucks, he was reassigned to the Comets on a condition stint. He played two games with the team before being loaned to the Canadian national junior team for the 2016 World Junior Ice Hockey Championships (WJC). During the WJC, Virtanen recorded one point in five games and took three penalties in the quarterfinal game against Finland. He responded to his online hate from fans saying, "I was more disappointed in losing the game. We went over there to win a gold medal and we didn't get it. Obviously I want to take a little bit of the responsibility for that." Upon returning to North America, Virtanen re-joined the Canucks and ended his rookie season with 13 points in 55 games.

Virtanen was invited to the Canucks training camp prior to the 2016–17 season but arrived overweight. He was instructed to maintain a weight of 213 over the offseason but upon arrival weighed in at 231 pounds. He played 10 games with the Canucks before being reassigned to the Utica Comets, where he remained for the majority of the season. On November 13, he was recalled to the Canucks, but three days later, he was sent back down again—he had registered only 9 goals and 10 assists in 65 games with the Canucks. While in Utica, Virtanen recorded 19 points 65 games while often playing a bottom-six role. His development in Utica earned him an invite to the Canucks training camp leading up to the 2017–18 season where he made the roster for opening night. He would spend the entirety of the season in the NHL and record 20 points in 75 games. On July 25, 2018, the Canucks re-signed Virtanen to a two-year $1.25 million contract while GM Jim Benning praised his "physical presence and speed."

Prior to the start of the 2018–19 season, TSN 1040 radio hosts Jason Brough and Mike Halford vowed to shotgun a beer every time Virtanen scored during the season, deeming it "Shotgun Jake." Following his first goal of the season in a 5–2 win over the Calgary Flames, fans took to Twitter to tweet videos of themselves Shotgunning beer using the hashtag Shotgun Jake. Although his season started off well with a career-high 22 points through 58 games, he suffered a fractured rib during a game against the Anaheim Ducks in February and remained out of the lineup for one month.

Leading up to the 2019–20 season, Virtanen attended the Canucks training camp where he was relegated to the third skating group consisting of mostly AHLers. When questioned, Canucks head coach Travis Green said there were "goals" that weren't met during the offseason. Green admitted that Virtanen would stay in the Canucks lineup but was not expected to have a large role during the season. In spite of his rocky start, Virtanen recorded a career-high 36 points in 69 games during the shortened regular season. As the NHL began to enter Stage 2 of their Return to Play process, Virtanen was filmed attending a night club called Celebrities Nightclub in Vancouver which the Canucks said was addressed internally. As the league readied to resume play for the post-season, Virtanen again unimpressed Canucks coaches during training camp and was scratched for their first game against the Minnesota Wild in the Qualifying Round. He returned to their lineup for Game 2 along with Loui Eriksson as a replacement for forwards Tyler Toffoli and Adam Gaudette and helped lead the team to a 4–3 win over Minnesota. In Vancouver's first–round series versus the St. Louis Blues, Virtanen scored a goal and an assist in Game 5 to help the Canucks comeback from a 3–1 deficit and win the game 4–3, giving Vancouver a 3–2 lead in the series, which they won in six games. During the second round against the Vegas Golden Knights, Virtanen helped push the team to a Game 7 elimination game after recording the game-winning goal in Game 6. Following their elimination in Game 7, he ended the postseason with three points in 16 games.

On October 22, 2020, Virtanen signed a two-year, $5.1 million contract with the Canucks. In the pandemic delayed  season, Virtanen struggled to contribute offensively with the Canucks producing a career low 5 goals in 38 regular season games.

Virtanen was placed on leave by the Canucks on May 1, 2021 and had his $3.4 million contract bought out by his hometown team in July, following sexual misconduct allegations. He was charged with sexual assault in January 2022 following an investigation by the Vancouver Police Department. The incident occurred on September 26, 2017 and on July 26, 2022 he was later cleared of all charges by jury. On July 25, 2021, Virtanen was placed on unconditional waivers by the Canucks for the purpose of a buyout from the remaining year of his contract.

Spartak Moscow
Remaining as a free agent over the off-season and with his sexual misconduct allegations pending, Virtanen was unable to secure a contract in the NHL. With the 2021–22 season underway abroad, on September 7, 2021, Virtanen was signed to a one-year contract with Russian club, Spartak Moscow of the Kontinental Hockey League (KHL). On March 7, 2022, Virtanen was released from his contract with Spartak Moscow due to a "breach of contract" during a period where multiple foreign KHL players had similarly left the league after the 2022 Russian invasion of Ukraine that February.

EHC Visp
On September 19, 2022, in attempting to make a return to the NHL, Virtanen signed a professional tryout agreement with the Edmonton Oilers. After attending the Oilers training camp and pre-season, Virtanen was released on October 6, 2022. Opting to return to Europe, Virtanen agreed to join second tier Swiss club, EHC Visp of the SL, by agreeing to a two-year contract on November 6, 2022. Virtanen got into an altercation with a teammate in January 2023, and was dismissed from the team in February 2023 after a player on his team told management an ultimatum of either keeping them or Virtanen.

Fischtown Pinguins
As a free agent, Virtanen was quickly signed to a contract in joining German club, Fischtown Pinguins of the DEL, for the remainder of the 2022–23 season with the option of a further year on February 14, 2023.

International play

Making his first appearance with the Canadian national team prior to the 2013–14 season, Virtanen joined the under-18 squad for the 2012 Ivan Hlinka Memorial Tournament. Playing in a grinding role, Virtanen recorded one assist in five games as Canada won its sixth consecutive gold medal at the event, which culminated with a 4–0 victory over the United States.

A first round exit from the WHL playoffs by Calgary allowed Virtanen to make a second appearance with the national team as he played in the 2014 IIHF World U18 Championships. He tied for the team lead in scoring with six points to help lead the Canadians to a bronze medal at the event.

At the 2016 IIHF World Junior Championships in Helsinki, Virtanen had one assist in five games and led Canada in penalty minutes at ten. Canada was eliminated by the host Finland in the quarterfinal.

Personal

Sexual assault allegation 
On May 1, 2021, Virtanen was placed on leave by the Canucks following a sexual assault allegation made by a woman identified in court documents as "M.S.". Virtanen and M.S. met at the 2017 Calgary Stampede and stayed in touch via text messages throughout the summer of 2017. She claimed that on September 26, 2017, she came to Vancouver for a photoshoot and to visit friends. She agreed to get together with Virtanen while in Vancouver, and he subsequently picked her up from a friend's house in North Vancouver and drove her to a Vancouver hotel. The woman claimed Virtanen then "used his body weight and superior strength" to render her powerless. "Virtanen proceeded to push open the plaintiff's legs and to have sexual intercourse with the plaintiff without the plaintiff's consent," her lawsuit reads. The Canucks later released a statement remarking that "their organization does not accept sexual misconduct of any kind, and that the claims as reported were being treated very seriously."

The alleged victim claims she finally decided to come forward after seeing others do so on Twitter. In a response filed by Virtanen in a British Columbia court, he acknowledged having sex with the woman, but claimed he had not forced himself on her and that she consented "through her words and conduct". Virtanen claimed M.S. gave him no verbal or physical indication that she did not want to engage in sexual activity. M.S. testified in court that she said "no" and physically pushed Virtanen off her.

After the Vancouver Police Department launched an investigation in May 2021, Virtanen was charged with one count of sexual assault by the British Columbia Prosecution Service in January 2022. The trial began on July 18, 2022 at the BC Supreme Court in Vancouver. On July 26, 2022, Virtanen was found not guilty by a jury.

Career statistics

Regular Season and Playoffs

International

References

External links

 

1996 births
Living people
Calgary Hitmen players
Canadian expatriate ice hockey players in the United States
Canadian ice hockey right wingers
Canadian people of Finnish descent
Finnish people of Canadian descent
HC Spartak Moscow players
Ice hockey people from British Columbia
National Hockey League first-round draft picks
Sportspeople from Abbotsford, British Columbia
Sportspeople from New Westminster
Utica Comets players
Vancouver Canucks draft picks
Vancouver Canucks players
EHC Visp players